"Final Song" is a song by Danish singer and songwriter MØ. It was released on 13 May 2016 for her second studio album, Forever Neverland, but was only included on the Japanese release of the album. The song was written and composed by MØ and Noonie Bao alongside MNEK, who produced the song. "Final Song" was released by Chess Club and RCA Victor and premiered on BBC Radio 1 on 12 May 2016 at 7:00 PM BST at Annie Mac. It was released on YouTube the same day and on iTunes Store the following day. It reached the top 5 in Denmark, the top 20 in Australia, Norway and the United Kingdom, and the top 100 in Canada and Sweden.

Background and release
The song was written by MØ, MNEK and Noonie Bao in Los Angeles in 2016. MØ sent a rough version of the song to MNEK with the changes she wanted to see, asking him to "make it a little lighter". The two later worked on it together, which ended being "dope" according to MNEK. MØ said of the song is "about reconnecting with your inner strength. With your inner glow, passion, spirit animal, whatever – the force that keeps us going and doing what we love. [...] We all need to feel empowered from within to be the best version of ourself, but it’s not always easy and that’s what inspired me to write these lyrics. When you’re united with your inner glow you can beat the fears and fly towards your dreams."

MØ released a snippet of the song on Instagram on 9 May 2016. Like her previous single "Kamikaze", "Final Song" was premiered by Annie Mac on BBC Radio 1 in the United Kingdom.

Composition
"Final Song" is a tropical house and dance-pop song, which contains elements of dancehall. The chorus features a "supremely weird, four-stepping drum machine and a flameout of synthesized xylophonic blips." Lyrically, the song is "about forging on through trying times and the importance of harnessing one's inner power."

The song is written in the key of E major with a common time tempo of 105 beats per minute. MØ's vocals span from B3 to E5 in the song.

Reception
Rolling Stone called the song an infectious summer anthem. Spin named it "a beautiful new pop confection". Fuse wrote it is "one of the more brilliant song of the summer contenders". Billboard wrote that she "keeps getting better with every release."

UK indie band Bastille covered the song in the Radio 1 Live Lounge in a mash-up with "The Final Countdown" and "7 Days".

Music video
The music video for the song directed by Tomas Whitmore was released to YouTube on 9 June 2016. The video was produced by Hugo Peers and shot in the California Desert National Conservation Area by DOP Niko Wiesnet.

Live performances
On 16 September 2016 MØ performed the single live for The Tonight Show with Jimmy Fallon.

Charts

Weekly charts

Year-end charts

Certifications

Release history

References

2016 songs
2016 singles
MØ songs
Songs written by MNEK
Songs written by Noonie Bao
Tropical house songs